Joseph Douglas Ball (January 7, 1896 – September 24, 1938) was an American murderer and suspected serial killer, sometimes referred to as the "Alligator Man", the "Butcher of Elmendorf" and the "Bluebeard of South Texas".  He is known to have killed two and is said to have killed as many as 20 women in the 1930s.  His existence was long believed to be apocryphal, but he is a familiar figure in Texas folklore.

Background 
Ball was the great-great-grandson of John Hart Crenshaw, a notorious illegal slave trader, kidnapper, and illegal slave breeder in Gallatin County, Illinois. After serving on the frontlines in Europe during World War I, Ball started his career as a bootlegger, providing illegal liquor to those who could pay for it. After the end of Prohibition, he opened a saloon called the Sociable Inn in Elmendorf, Texas.  He built a pond that contained six alligators because he misunderstood the term corpus delicti, believing that a murder conviction without a body would be impossible.  He charged people to view them, especially during feeding time; the food consisted mostly of live cats and dogs.

Murders 
After a while, women in the area were reported missing, including barmaids, former girlfriends, and his wife. When two Bexar County deputy sheriffs went to question him in 1938, Ball pulled a handgun from his cash register and killed himself with a bullet through the heart (as noted on his death certificate by the coroner, but some sources report that he shot himself in the head).

A handyman who conspired with Ball, Clifford Wheeler, admitted to helping Ball dispose of the bodies of two of the women he had killed. Wheeler led them to the remains of Hazel Brown and Minnie Gotthard.
Few written sources from the era could verify Ball's crimes. Newspaper editor Michael Hall investigated the story in depth in 2002 and wrote on his findings for Texas Monthly.

In popular culture 
The film Eaten Alive by Tobe Hooper was inspired by Ball. The film features a man named Judd, a serial killer who runs a hotel and disposes of his victims' bodies by feeding them to a Nile crocodile.

Ball was referenced in Bones in the fifth episode of season eight, "The Method in the Madness".

Macabre wrote a song called "Joe Ball Was His Name" which can be found on Carnival of Killers.

See also 
 List of serial killers in the United States
 List of serial killers by number of victims

References

External links 
CrimeLibrary.com article on Joe Ball
 Joe Ball – The Butcher of Elmendorf (documentary)

1896 births
1938 suicides
20th-century American criminals
American bootleggers
Criminals from Texas
Military personnel from San Antonio
Suicides by firearm in Texas
Suspected serial killers
United States Army personnel of World War I